Bohumil Povejšil (born 15 July 1912, date of death unknown) was a Czech gymnast. He competed in eight events at the 1936 Summer Olympics.

References

1912 births
Year of death missing
Czech male artistic gymnasts
Olympic gymnasts of Czechoslovakia
Gymnasts at the 1936 Summer Olympics
Gymnasts from Prague